The 9th Ohio Infantry Regiment was an infantry regiment that was a part of the Union Army during the American Civil War. The members of the regiment were primarily of German descent and the unit was the first almost all-German unit to enter the Union Army.

Organization
Between 1836 and 1860, four German militia units had been formed in Cincinnati, Ohio. In 1861, in response to a call to arms by President Abraham Lincoln and subsequently by Ohio Governor William Dennison, these units swelled with hundreds of volunteers. Gustav Bergmann, a Cincinnati public school teacher, was the first volunteer to join the unit. The city of Cincinnati gave $250,000.00 for the organization of this unit. Nearly 1,500 men, mostly of German descent, volunteered for the 9th Ohio Infantry Regiment in the first three days. Col. Robert L. McCook, a local lawyer, trained and drilled the new soldiers at Camp Harrison and Camp Dennison, both near the city.

The initial field officers on April 23, 1861, were:

Colonel Robert L. McCook 
Lieutenant Colonel Karl Sonderson 
Major Frank Mattice
Surgeon Karl Krause
Asst. Surgeon Rudolph Wirth
Adjutant August Willich

The regiment lost six officers and 85 enlisted men killed and mortally wounded during its three-year term of service. It also lost two officers and 60 enlisted men to disease, for a total of 153.

Battle of Carnifex Ferry
The 9th Ohio Infantry Regiment participated in the Battle of Carnifex Ferry, which took place on September 10, 1861. Casualties were eight men killed and two wounded while attacking the Confederate left flank, defended by the 36th Virginia Infantry.

See also
 List of Ohio Civil War units
 Ohio in the Civil War

Notes

References

9th Ohio Infantry by Larry Stevens
"Die Neuner" (Archived 2009-10-23) The 9th Ohio Infantry Regiment in the American Civil War, 1861-1864
National Colors of the 9th O.V.I.
The Queen City, by Daniel Hurley, published by the Cincinnati Historical Society, 1982, page 45.
Cincinnati, a Guide to the Queen City and Its Neighbors, American Guide Series, The Weisen-Hart Press, May 1943, page 219
9th Ohio Volunteer Infantry Regiment by Joe Reinhart
 Tafel, Gustav. "The Cincinnati Germans in the Civil War." Translated and edited with Supplements on Germans from Ohio, Kentucky, and Indiana in the Civil War by Don Heinrich Tolzmann. (Milford, Ohio: Little Miami Publishing Co., 2010).
 Bertsch, Friedrich, Wilhelm Stängel, and Joseph R. Reinhart. 2010. A German hurrah!: Civil War letters of Friedrich Bertsch and Wilhelm Stängel, 9th Ohio Infantry. Kent, Ohio: Kent State University Press.

External links
Civil War Index: 9th Ohio Infantry - 3 Months Service in the American Civil War
Civil War Index: 9th Ohio Infantry - 3 Years Service in the American Civil War

Units and formations of the Union Army from Ohio
German-American history
Cincinnati in the American Civil War
1861 establishments in Ohio
Military units and formations established in 1861
Military units and formations disestablished in 1865